Albert Seitz (24 June 1872 – 23 September 1937) was a French composer and viola player.

Born in Besançon, Seitz was a violist with the Orchestre de la Société des Concerts du Conservatoire from 1900 to 1932.

Selected works
 Un nuage à la lune de miel, Opérette in 1 act (1896); libretto by Charles Frot
 Lamento for harmonium and piano (1898)
 Chant dans la nuit, 2 Pièces for flute (or violin) or cello and piano, Op. 14 (published 1901 by Demets of Paris)
    Aux jours heureux
    Évocation
 Sextet No. 1 for flute, oboe, clarinet, bassoon, horn and piano, Op. 22 No. 1
 Sextet No. 2 for flute, oboe, clarinet, bassoon, horn and piano, Op. 22 No. 2
 String Quartet in C major, Op. 24
 Sonata in C minor for violin and piano, Op. 30 (1904)
 Fantaisie de concert in D minor for viola or cello and piano, Op. 31 (1904)
 2 Pièces for violin and piano, Op. 33
     Tendresse
     Danse szekler
 Offertoire, Trio for violin, harmonium and piano, Op. 37 (1899) 
 Cloches pascales, Trio for violin, harmonium and piano, Op. 44 (1899) 
 Andante cantabile for clarinet and organ

References

External links
 

1872 births
1937 deaths
French classical violists
19th-century French composers
20th-century French composers
French male composers
Musicians from Besançon
20th-century French male musicians
19th-century French male musicians
20th-century violists